Parekklisia ( []) is a village in the Limassol District of Cyprus, located northeast of Agios Tychonas. As a village near the sea, it was first inhabited in the Early Aceramic Neolithic Period about 8200 B.C. in the site named "Shillourokambos". There, in a tomb, French archaeologists discovered the earliest domesticated cat in the world.

References

Communities in Limassol District

   

PAREKKLISHIA = LAPRATZIA